The 1997–98 San Francisco Dons men's basketball team represented the University of San Francisco as a member of the West Coast Conference during the 1997–98 NCAA Division I men's basketball season. The Dons, led by head coach Philip Mathews, finished the season with a 19–11 record (7–7 WCAC), won the WCC tournament, and received an automatic bid to the NCAA Tournament as No. 14 seed in the West region. San Francisco was defeated by eventual National runner-up Utah in the opening round.

Roster

Schedule and results

|-
!colspan=9 style=| Non-Conference Regular season

|-
!colspan=9 style=| WCC Regular season

|-
!colspan=9 style=| WCC tournament

|-
!colspan=9 style=| NCAA Tournament

Rankings

References

San Francisco
San Francisco Dons men's basketball seasons
San Francisco
San Francisco Dons
San Francisco Dons